Tünde Csonkics (born 20 September 1958) is a Hungarian chess player who received the FIDE title of Woman Grandmaster (WGM) in 1990. She is a Hungarian Women's Chess Champion (1981).

Biography
In 1979, Tünde Csonkics won the International Women Chess Tournament in Nałęczów. In 1981, she shared the third place in the International Women Chess Tournament in Novi Sad. In 1991, Tünde Csonkics participated in the Women's World Chess Interzonal Tournament in Subotica, where she took 19th place. She has participated many times in the Hungarian Women's Chess Championship where she won gold (1981) and silver (1995) medals.

Tünde Csonkics played for Hungary in the Women's Chess Olympiads:
 In 1980, at first reserve board in the 9th Chess Olympiad (women) in Valletta (+3, =0, -1) and won team silver medal
 In 1982, at first reserve board in the 10th Chess Olympiad (women) in Lucerne (+0, =2, -2) and won team bronze medal
 In 1992, at second board in the 30th Chess Olympiad (women) in Manila (+5, =5, -3)
 In 1994, at first reserve board in the 31st Chess Olympiad (women) in Moscow (+0, =0, -2) and won team silver medal

In 1990, she was awarded the FIDE Woman Grandmaster (WGM) title. Tünde Csonkics is also an FIDE International Arbiter (1992). Since 2002 she has rarely played in chess tournaments.

References

External links
 
 
 

1958 births
Living people
Hungarian female chess players
Chess woman grandmasters
Chess Olympiad competitors
Chess arbiters